The following is a list of massacres that have occurred in over the past number of years in Nigeria (numbers may be approximate):

List

Political violence

Bandit attacks

Herder-farmer conflicts and communal conflicts

Literature 
, "Religious violence in Nigeria: Causal diagnoses and strategic recommendations to the state and religious communities", African Journal on Conflict Resolution (2012) p. 107-112.

References 

Nigeria
Massacres